Lord Lundy may refer to:

Lord William, a traditional Scottish ballad
Lord Lundy, one of the Cautionary Tales for Children by Hilaire Belloc